Olga Aleksandrovna Fatkulina (born 23 January 1990) is a Russian long-track speed skater. She competed for Russia at the 2010 and 2014 Winter Olympics in the women's 500 m and 1000 m.

Career
In the 2013 World Single Distance Championships she won the gold medal in the 1000 meters race, and a bronze medal in the 500 metres. At the 2014 Winter Olympics she won the silver medal in the 500 meters event. On 24 November 2017, she was disqualified from the 2014 Winter Olympics and had her silver medal stripped. On 1 February 2018, her results were restored and ban lifted as a result of the successful appeal.

Records

Personal records

Results timeline

World Cup podiums

Overall rankings

References

External links

1990 births
Russian female speed skaters
Speed skaters at the 2010 Winter Olympics
Speed skaters at the 2014 Winter Olympics
Speed skaters at the 2022 Winter Olympics
Olympic speed skaters of Russia
Sportspeople from Chelyabinsk
Living people
Russian sportspeople in doping cases
Doping cases in speed skating
Medalists at the 2014 Winter Olympics
Olympic medalists in speed skating
Olympic silver medalists for Russia
World Single Distances Speed Skating Championships medalists
World Sprint Speed Skating Championships medalists